Cristo Rey Fort Worth College Prep is a Roman Catholic high school in Fort Worth, Texas. It is a part of the Cristo Rey Network of 38 schools throughout the United States and is under the Roman Catholic Diocese of Fort Worth. The first Cristo Rey School was established in 1996 in Chicago, Illinois. In conjunction with local businesses, the students' education is subsidized through the work-study model used by schools in the Cristo Rey Network, of which it is a member.

The first campus was located at Terrell Heights Historic District in the former Our Mother of Mercy Catholic School. Students attending work jobs part-time to pay for tuition. Currently, Cristo Rey Fort Worth is located on a 4.47 acres at 2633 Altamesa Boulevard in Fort Worth, Texas 76133.  The first graduating class from Cristo Rey Fort Worth will be in late May 2022.  The school now enrolls all four grades 9 to 12, and admits students to grades 9 and 10 only.

It opened in 2018. The school's mission and vision statement explains the goals: Cristo Rey Fort Worth College Prep is a Catholic learning community that educates young people of limited economic means to become men and women of faith, purpose and service. Through a rigorous college preparatory curriculum, integrated with a relevant work study experience, students graduate ready to succeed in college and in life."

History 
Cristo Rey Fort Worth began with a feasibility study required by the Cristo Rey Network. This required that at least 35 corporate partners be found for the work component of the student experience. The founders raised $3 million for initial support. For the first two years of operation, 300 potential students were identified. Students are to be from low-income families which are asked to pay whatever they can, typically about 10% of the tuition. The school is not a part of the diocesan system but rather an independent Catholic school accredited by the Texas Catholic Conference.

The school formerly occupied the buildings of the former "Our Mother of Mercy" school. The school is currently on the new, larger campus on Altamesa Boulevard as of Fall of 2019.

References

External links
 
 Cristo Rey Network

Further reading
 Kearney, G. R. More Than a Dream: The Cristo Rey Story: How One School's Vision Is Changing the World. Chicago, Ill: Loyola Press, 2008. 

2018 establishments in Texas
Educational institutions established in 2018
High schools in Fort Worth, Texas
Catholic secondary schools in Texas
Cristo Rey Network
Poverty-related organizations